The 2013 Norwegian Figure Skating Championships was held at the DNB Arena in Stavanger from December 14 to 16, 2012. Skaters competed in the discipline of single skating. The results were among the criteria used to determine the teams to the 2013 World Championships, 2013 European Championships, 2013 Nordic Championships, and 2013 World Junior Championships.

Senior results

Ladies

Junior results

Men

Ladies

External links
 Official site
 2013 Norwegian Championships results
 info at the Norges Skøyteforbund

Norwegian Figure Skating Championships
Norwegian Figure Skating Championships, 2013
2013 in Norwegian sport